Desert varnish or rock varnish is an orange-yellow to black coating found on exposed rock surfaces in arid environments. Desert varnish is approximately one micrometer thick and exhibits nanometer-scale layering. Rock rust and desert patina are other terms which are also used for the condition, but less often.

Formation
Desert varnish forms only on physically stable rock surfaces that are no longer subject to frequent precipitation, fracturing or wind abrasion. The varnish is primarily composed of particles of clay along with oxides of iron and manganese.  There is also a host of trace elements and almost always some organic matter. The color of the varnish varies from shades of brown to black.

It has been suggested that desert varnish should be investigated as a potential candidate for a "shadow biosphere". However, a 2008 microscopy study posited that desert varnish has already been reproduced with chemistry not involving life in the lab, and that the main component is actually silica and not clay as previously thought. The study notes that desert varnish is an excellent fossilizer for microbes and indicator of water. Desert varnish appears to have been observed by rovers on Mars, and if examined may contain fossilized life from Mars's wet period.

Composition

Originally scientists thought that the varnish was made from substances drawn out of the rocks it coats.  Microscopic and microchemical observations, however, show that a major part of varnish is clay, which could only arrive by wind.  Clay, then, acts as a substrate to catch additional substances that chemically react together when the rock reaches high temperatures in the desert sun.  Wetting by dew is also important in the process.

An important characteristic of black desert varnish is that it has an unusually high concentration of manganese. Manganese is relatively rare in the Earth's crust, making up only 0.12% of its weight. In black desert varnish, however, manganese is 50 to 60 times more abundant. One proposal  for a mechanism of desert varnish formation is that it is caused by manganese-oxidizing microbes (mixotrophs) which are common in environments poor in organic nutrients. A micro-environment pH above 7.5 is inhospitable for manganese-concentrating microbes. In such conditions, orange varnishes develop, poor in manganese (Mn) but rich in iron (Fe). An alternative hypothesis for Mn/Fe fluctuation has been proposed that considers Mn-rich and Fe-rich varnishes to be related to humid and arid climates, respectively.

Even though it contains high concentrations of iron and manganese, there are no significant modern uses of desert varnish. However, some Native American peoples created petroglyphs by scraping or chipping away the dark varnish to expose the lighter rock beneath.

Desert varnish often obscures the identity of the underlying rock, and different rocks have varying abilities to accept and retain varnish. Limestones, for example,  typically do not have varnish because they are too water-soluble and therefore do not provide a stable surface for varnish to form. Shiny, dense and black varnishes form on basalt, fine quartzites and metamorphosed shales due to these rocks' relatively high resistance to weathering.

Its presence has been cited as a key factor in the preservation of a large number of petroglyphs dating back to the Iron Age and earlier in areas such as the Wadi Saham in the United Arab Emirates.

See also

References

External links

 Desert Varnish
 Rock Varnish (desert varnish): An Internet Primer for Rock Art Research by Ronald I. Dorn, Professor of Geography Arizona State University
 DESERT VARNISH (rock varnish) 
 New Way Suggested to Search for Life on Mars — Space.com
 Researcher: Mars rock varnish hints of life July 2, 2001 By Richard Stenger CNN 
 Rock Varnish As A Habitat For Extant Life On Mars

Deposition (geology)
Sedimentology
Deserts
Rocks
Hypothetical life forms